Cẩm Xuyên is a township and capital of Cẩm Xuyên District, Hà Tĩnh Province, Vietnam.

References

Populated places in Hà Tĩnh province
District capitals in Vietnam
Communes of Hà Tĩnh province
Townships in Vietnam